The Osyotr is a river in Tula and Moscow Oblasts in Russia, a right tributary of the Oka. The Osyotr freezes up in November and stays icebound until the first half of April. The town of Zaraysk is located on the Osyotr River.

References 

Rivers of Tula Oblast
Rivers of Moscow Oblast